Jukka Pekka Vihriälä (born 1 December 1945 in Vimpeli) is a Finnish agronomist, farmer and politician. He was a member of the Parliament of Finland from 1983 to 2007, representing the Centre Party.

References

1945 births
Living people
People from Vimpeli
Centre Party (Finland) politicians
Members of the Parliament of Finland (1983–87)
Members of the Parliament of Finland (1987–91)
Members of the Parliament of Finland (1991–95)
Members of the Parliament of Finland (1995–99)
Members of the Parliament of Finland (1999–2003)
Members of the Parliament of Finland (2003–07)
University of Helsinki alumni